The Netherlands women's national volleyball team is the national volleyball team of the Netherlands. It is governed by the Nederlandse Volleybalbond (NeVoBo). Following the 1995 European Championship they hosted in Arnhem and finishing fifth at the 1996 Olympics, the Dutch have had moments of success amidst instability, such as the title of the 2007 FIVB World Grand Prix, and a return to the Olympic Games in 2016, where the Netherlands got to fourth place.

Results

Summer Olympics
 Champions   Runners-up   Third place   Fourth place

World Championship
 Champions   Runners-up   Third place   Fourth place

World Cup
 Champions   Runners-up   Third place   Fourth place

European Games
 Champions   Runners-up   Third place   Fourth place

European Championship
 Champions   Runners-up   Third place   Fourth place

World Grand Prix
 Champions   Runners-up   Third place   Fourth place

Nations League
 Champions   Runners-up   Third place   Fourth place

Team

Current squad
The following is the Dutch roster in the 2018 World Championship.

Head coach:  Jamie Morrison

Managers

Notable players
In alphabetical order

 Alice Blom
 Cintha Boersma
 Erna Brinkman
 Heleen Crielaard
 Irina Donets
 Jolanda Elshof
 Riëtte Fledderus
 Jerine Fleurke
 Manon Flier
 Suzanne Freriks
 Petra Groenland
 Kirsten Gleis
 Aafke Hament
 Ruth Heerschap
 Saskia van Hintum
 Francien Huurman
 Carlijn Jans
 Marjolein de Jong
 Vera Koenen
 Marrit Leenstra
 Elles Leferink
 Hanneke van Leusden
 Irena Machovcak
 Floortje Meijners
 Linda Moons
 Mirjam Orsel
 Kitty Sanders
 Titia Sustring
 Maureen Staal
 Chaïne Staelens
 Kim Staelens
 Debby Stam
 Claudia van Thiel
 Janneke van Tienen
 Lisette van der Ven
 Ingrid Visser
 Sanna Visser
 Henriëtte Weersing
 Ruth van der Wel
 Caroline Wensink
 Sandra Wiegers
 Elke Wijnhoven
 Quinta Steenbergen
Silvia Raaymakers

See also
 Netherlands men's national volleyball team

References

External links
Official website
FIVB profile

W
National women's volleyball teams
Volleyball in the Netherlands